Damdin (Damdiny in the genitive form for patronymics) is a common part of Mongolian names, as in:

Patronymic 
 Damdin Sükhbaatar (1893–1923), founding father of Mongolian independence
 Damdiny Demberel (born 1941), speaker of the Mongolian parliament since 2008
 Damdinsüren Altangerel, a Mongolian linguist and author (1945–1998)
 Damdiny Süldbayar (born 1981), Mongolian olympic judoka
 Damdinsürengiin Nyamkhüü (born 1979), Mongolian judoka
 Damdin Tsogtbaatar (born 1970)

Proper name 
 Dam Din, the underground-travelling Khmer legendary hero
 Manlaibaatar Damdinsüren (1871–1921), Mongolian general and politician in the 1911–1920 period
 Jamtsangiin Damdinsüren (1898–1938), head of state of Mongolia from 1927 to 1929
 Tsendiin Damdin (1957–2018), retired Mongolian olympic judoka